Hantsavichy District is an administrative subdivision, a raion of Brest Region, in Belarus. Its administrative center is Hantsavichy.

Demographics
At the time of the Belarus Census (2009), Hantsavichy Raion had a population of 31,170. Of these, 95.6% were of Belarusian, 2.2% Russian, 1.2% Polish and 0.6% Ukrainian ethnicity. 90.5% spoke Belarusian and 8.5% Russian as their native language.

 
Districts of Brest Region